Giorgio Francia (born November 8, 1947) is a former racing driver from Italy. He was the Polifac Formel 3 Trophy champion in 1974.

Francia unsuccessfully entered two Formula One Grands Prix. The first was in a works Brabham BT45B, in Martini Racing colours, at the 1977 Italian Grand Prix. He was withdrawn during practice. His second attempt was with Osella at the 1981 Spanish Grand Prix, where he was the slowest in practice and failed to qualify.

He raced in many categories and competed in sports car racing and touring cars until the late 1990s, driving a works Osella sports prototype in endurance racing in the late 1970s and early 1980s, and also taking part in the factory Alfa Romeo team in the CIVT (Italian Superturismo) and the DTM.

Complete Formula One results
(key)

References

Italian racing drivers
Italian Formula One drivers
Brabham Formula One drivers
Osella Formula One drivers
German Formula Three Championship drivers
European Formula Two Championship drivers
World Touring Car Championship drivers
1947 births
Living people
Sportspeople from Bologna
World Sportscar Championship drivers
24 Hours of Spa drivers